Panagaeus is a genus of ground beetle native to the Holarctic (including Europe), the Near East, and North Africa. It contains the following species:

 Panagaeus abei Nakane, 1997
 Panagaeus asuai Ogueta, 1966 
 Panagaeus bipustulatus Fabricius, 1775
 Panagaeus coreanus Nakane, 1997
 Panagaeus cruciger Say, 1823 
 Panagaeus cruxmajor Linnaeus, 1758
 Panagaeus davidi Fairmaire, 1887
 Panagaeus fasciatus Say, 1823 
 Panagaeus japonicus Chaudoir, 1861
 Panagaeus panamensis Laferte-Senectere, 1851 
 Panagaeus piacenzae Dellabeffa, 1983 
 Panagaeus quadrisignatus Chavrolat, 1835 
 Panagaeus relictus Semenov & Bogachev, 1938 
 Panagaeus robustus A. Morawitz, 1862
 Panagaeus sallei Chaudoir, 1861

References

External links
Panagaeus at Fauna Europaea

Panagaeinae